The Tennis Channel Open was a men's tennis tournament on the ATP International Series which was held for the first time in Las Vegas, Nevada from February 27 to March 5, 2006.  In the men's singles final, James Blake defeated Lleyton Hewitt while the men's doubles title was won by Bob and Mike Bryan.

In 2005, The Tennis Channel purchased the tournament from IMG and moved it from Scottsdale to Las Vegas. In April 2008, The Tennis Channel announced that it was selling the tournament to the ATP, and the week the event had been held was now the first week of Davis Cup.

Past finals
The tournament had been in existence since 1986 located at the Scottsdale Radisson Resort. From 1987–2005 the tournament took place at the Fairmont Scottsdale Princess, where Andre Agassi was crowned champion four times.

Singles

Doubles

See also
 The Tennis Channel
 Alan King Tennis Classic
 Las Vegas Challenger
 List of tennis tournaments

References

External links
The Tennis Channel official website
Tennis Channel Open homepPage

 
ATP Tour
Grand Prix tennis circuit
Hard court tennis tournaments
Defunct tennis tournaments in the United States
Tennis in Las Vegas